The Social Progress Imperative is a US-based nonprofit created in 2012  best known for the Social Progress Index, a multi-indicator index that assesses the social and environmental performance of different countries. The Social Progress Index is an effort to complement the measure of national performance using traditional economic measures such as gross domestic product with data on social and environmental performance.

Social Progress Index 

The Social Progress Index examines social and environmental indicators that capture three distinct dimensions of social progress: Basic Human Needs, Foundations of Wellbeing, and Opportunity. The most recent version of the Social Progress Index is the 2021 Social Progress Index.

Awards 
Michael Green's TED Talk on The Social Progress Index was chosen as one of TED's favorite of 2014.

Leadership 
Michael E Porter of Harvard Business School is Chairman of the Advisory Board of the Social Progress Imperative. Other members of its board include Judith Roden of the Rockefeller Foundation and Matthew Bishop of The Economist magazine. Economist Michael Green is Executive Director of the Social Progress Imperative.

See also 
 Social Progress Index

References

Non-profit organizations based in the United States
Organizations established in 2012
2012 establishments in the United States